Events from the year 1906 in Denmark.

Incumbents
 Monarch – Christian IX (until 29 January), Frederick VIII
 Prime minister – J. C. Christensen

Events

 30 January  The provlamation of Frederik CIII as King of Denmark.
 12 September – The inventor and aviation pioneer Jacob Christian Ellehammer makes a sustained but tethered flight in his self-built Ellehammer semi-biplane on the small  outside Copenhagen, three years after the world’s first historical flight by the Wright brothers in 1903. The flight distance is 42 meters at an altitude of over 50 centimeters.
 6 November – Ole Olsen founds Nordisk Film in Valby, Copenhagen, making it the oldest continuously operating film studio in the world.

Culture

Music
 11 November  Carl Nielsen's opera Maskarade premieres at the Royal Danish Theatre-

Sports
 5 August  Thorvald Ellegaard wins gold in men's sprint at the 1906 UCI Track Cycling World Championships.

Births
 2 October – Arne Sørensen, politician (died 1978)
 10 October – Leo Mathisen, jazz musician and singer (died 1969)
 8 November – H. C. Hansen, politician, former prime minister (died 1960)

Deaths
 29 January – HM Christian IX (born 1818)
 13 February – Albert Gottschalk, painter (born 1866)
 12 April – Søren Anton van der Aa Kühle, brewer and businessman (born 1849)
 8 June – C. F. E. Horneman, composer (born 1840)
 28 July – August Jerndorff, painter (born 1846)
 29 October – Jacob Heinrich Moresco, businessman (born 1828)

References

External links

 
Denmark
Years of the 20th century in Denmark
1900s in Denmark
Denmark